Sangeeta Chauhan (born 22 March 1959) is an Indian politician who served as Member of 17th Uttar Pradesh Assembly from Naugawan Sadat Assembly constituency on behalf of Bharatiya Janata Party. She is the first lady as MLA of Naugawan Sadat constituency.

Personal life 
She was born on 22 March 1959 in Delhi. She married Chetan Chauhan in 30 January 1992.

References 

1959 births
Living people
Bharatiya Janata Party politicians from Uttar Pradesh
Women from Delhi
Women in Uttar Pradesh politics
Uttar Pradesh MLAs 2017–2022
21st-century Indian women politicians